Chigiri is a rural locality (a selo) and the administrative center of Chigirinsky Selsoviet of Blagoveshchensky District, Amur Oblast, Russia. The population was 10,244 as of 2018. There are 210 streets.

Geography 
Chigiri is located 11 km north of Blagoveshchensk (the district's administrative centre) by road. Berezki is the nearest rural locality.

References 

Rural localities in Blagoveshchensky District, Amur Oblast